There are 96 sites in the National Register of Historic Places listings in North Side Chicago — of more than 350 listings within the City of Chicago, in Cook County, Illinois.

The North Side is defined for this article as the area west of Lake Michigan, north of North Avenue (1600 N.), and east of the Chicago River — plus the area north of Fullerton Avenue going west of the River and north to the Chicago city limits.

Current listings
The listed properties are distributed across 20 of the 77 well-defined community areas of Chicago.

|}

See also

List of Chicago Landmarks

National Register of Historic Places listings in Central Chicago
National Register of Historic Places listings in South Side Chicago
National Register of Historic Places listings in West Side Chicago
List of Registered Historic Places in Illinois
List of National Historic Landmarks in Illinois

References

External links
Chicago Listing on the National Register of Historic Places, August 5, 2011, City of Chicago, Rahm Emanuel, Mayor.
NPS Focus database, National Park Service.

North Side
Chicago-related lists